Sons for the Return Home is a 1979 New Zealand film directed by Paul Maunder.
The film is based on the 1973 book by Albert Wendt.

Synopsis
A romance develops between Sione a Samoan and Sarah a white middle class New Zealander. They each finds the other's culture hard to adjust to with Friends and family not being supportive, especially when she becomes pregnant.

Cast

Reviews
Uelese Petaia shared a Best Actor Award with Al Pacino at the 1980 Karlovy Vary International Film Festival.

References

External links 
 

1979 films
1970s New Zealand films
1970s English-language films